John Lewis Heilbron (born 17 March 1934, San Francisco) is an American historian of science best known for his work in the history of physics and the history of astronomy.  He is Professor of History and Vice-Chancellor Emeritus (Vice-Chancellor 1990–1994) at the University of California, Berkeley, senior research fellow at Worcester College, Oxford, and visiting professor at Yale University and the California Institute of Technology.  He edited the academic journal Historical Studies in the Physical and Biological Sciences for twenty-five years.

Biography
Heilbron attended Lowell High School in San Francisco, California, and was a member of the Lowell Forensic Society.  He received his A.B. (1955) and M.A. (1958) degrees in physics and his Ph.D. (1964) in history from the University of California, Berkeley.  He was Thomas Kuhn's graduate student in the 1960s when Kuhn was writing The Structure of Scientific Revolutions.

Heilbron is a member of the Royal Swedish Academy of Sciences.

Awards and honors
 1988: member, American Academy of Arts and Sciences
 1990: member, American Philosophical Society
 2000: Honorary degree, University of Pavia.
 2006: Abraham Pais Prize for History of Physics, a joint award of the American Physical Society and the American Institute of Physics.
 1993: awarded the George Sarton Medal by the History of Science Society.
 1988: Honorary degree, University of Bologna.

Main books
 2022: 'The Incomparable Monsignor: Francesco Bianchini's World of Science, History, and Court Intrigue.' [(Oxford University Press)]. 
 2021: 'The Ghoist of Galileo in a Forgotten Painting from the English Civil War.' [(Oxford University Press)]. 
 2020: ' Niels Bohr: A Very Short Introduction', [(Oxford University Press)]. 
 2018: The History of Physics: A Very Short Introduction, Oxford University Press. 
 2013: Love, Literature, and the Quantum Atom, with Finn Aaserud Oxford University Press. 
 2010: Galileo, Oxford University Press. . (See Galileo Galilei.)
 2003: The Oxford Companion to the History of Modern Science (ed.), Oxford University Press. .
 2003: Ernest Rutherford and the Explosion of Atoms, Oxford Portraits in Science, Oxford University Press. .
 1999: The Sun in the Church: Cathedrals as Solar Observatories. Harvard University Press. . 2001 paperback: .
 1999: Electricity in the 17th and 18th Centuries: A Study of Early Modern Physics. Dover Publications. .
 1997: Geometry Civilized: History, Culture, Technique. Oxford University Press. . 2000 paperback: .
 1989: Lawrence and His Laboratory: A History of the Lawrence Berkeley Laboratory, with Robert W. Seidel. University of California Press. .
 1986: The Dilemmas of an Upright Man: Max Planck and the Fortunes of German Science, California University Press. 
 1979: Electricity in the 17th and 18th Centuries: A Study of Early Modern Physics, University of California Press. .
 1974: H. G. J. Moseley: The Life and Letters of an English Physicist, 1887-1915, University of California Press. .

Notes

References

 Brief biography in AIP Center for History of Physics Newsletter, Volume XXXVIII, No. 1, Spring 2006.

External links
"What Time Is It in the Transept?" D. Graham Burnett book review of The Sun in the Church: Cathedrals as Solar Observatories, The New York Times, October 24, 1999.
Quote from Burnett's review: "How ironic…the church's seemingly backward attitude toward heliocentrism actually nurtured a powerful and emergent scientific method."
Video of a talk by Heilbron titled "Remarks on the Writing of Biography."

Living people
21st-century American historians
21st-century American male writers
American historians of science
Fellows of Worcester College, Oxford
University of California, Berkeley alumni
University of California, Berkeley College of Letters and Science faculty
Yale University faculty
Members of the Royal Swedish Academy of Sciences
1934 births
American encyclopedists
Historians from California
American male non-fiction writers
Members of the American Philosophical Society